Newtown Creek may refer to:

Streams

United States
California
Newtown Creek is a tributary of Churn Creek in Shasta County, California.

New York
Newtown Creek is a tributary of the East River in New York City, New York.

Pennsylvania
Newtown Creek is a tributary of the Neshaminy Creek in Bucks County, Pennsylvania.

See also
Related to the New York City creek:
Newtown Creek Wastewater Treatment Plant
Newtown Creek Oil Spill

Related to the Pennsylvania creek:
Newtown Creek Bridge